Georgina Rodríguez Hernández (born 27 January 1994) is a Spanish social media influencer and model.

Personal life 
Rodríguez was born in Buenos Aires to a Spanish-Argentine father and a Spanish mother originally from Murcia. Her family, including an older sister named Ivana, lived with her paternal relatives. When Rodriguez was one year old, her mother decided she wanted to return to Spain, and the family moved to the northern Spanish city of Jaca in the Province of Huesca.

Rodríguez has been in a relationship with Portuguese footballer Cristiano Ronaldo since 2016, after meeting him at a Gucci retail store in Madrid, where she was working as a sales assistant.

Georgina Rodríguez has had three biological children with Cristiano Ronaldo, and is the stepmother of his other three children. In November 2017, Rodríguez gave birth to their daughter, Alana Martina. Rodríguez gave birth to twins in April 2022. The boy twin died during childbirth, while the girl twin survived, Bella Esmeralda. Her stepchildren are two sons, Cristiano Junior and Mateo, and a daughter, Eva Maria.

Rodriguez was the subject of an eponymous 2022 Netflix documentary, I Am Georgina, in which she was also credited as a director.

References and notes

1994 births
Living people
Spanish people of Argentine descent
Argentine people of Spanish descent
Association footballers' wives and girlfriends
Argentine female models
Spanish female models
Social media influencers